Louis Gonzaga may refer to:

 Louis Gonzaga, Duke of Nevers (1539–1595), Italian-French dignitary and diplomat
 Louis Gonzaga (Rodomonte) (1500–1532), Imperial mercenary captain for Emperor Charles V